Lodhurva Jain temple is a Jain temple in the Lodhruva village of Jaisalmer district in Rajasthan.

History 
Lodhruva was established as the capital by Rawal Deoraj, the Bhati clan, in 8th−9th century CE. The temple was constructed in the 9th century along with city of Lodhruva. Rawal Jaisal, a famous prince of the Bhati clan, moved his capital from Lodhruva to Jaisalmer in 1156 CE. The temple was also plundered by Mahmud of Ghazni and Muhammad of Ghor. This led to temple being destroyed in 1152 CE. In 1615 CE, the temples undergone repairs and renovations. The temple remains the only standing structure in the ruined city of Lodhruva.

About temple 

Lodhurva is one of the important Jain center. The temple is built with yellow limestone and sandstone; famous for the intricate craftsmanship. The temple features ornate torana (arched gateway), and stone carvings of Kalpavriksha and kalputra. Lodhurva Jain temple is considered one of the best example of Jain architecture in Rajasthan. According to William Guy, the temple walls are folded similar to an accordion and features exquisite screen carvings of jali.

The mulnayak (main deity) of the temple is a black marble idol of Parshvanatha with a canopy of thousand hoods over head. In Shvetambara tradition, idols tend to derive their name from a geographical region, the lodhurva Parshvanath is one of 108 prominent idols of Parshvanath idols.

According to Jain belief, A snake comes out every evening from a hole in the temple to drink milk offering. As per popular belief, the sight of this snake is a blessing. There is a ritual for people to visit the shrine after marriage.

Fair 
A fair is organised here in the month of Pausha, the event draws a huge number of devotees.

Gallery

See also 
 Jaisalmer Fort
 Jaisalmer Fort Jain temples

References

Citations

Sources

Books

Web

External links 
 

Jain temples in Rajasthan
9th-century Jain temples
Jaisalmer district